Alhagi graecorum is a species of legume commonly known as mannatree or manna tree. Previously it was considered a subspecies of Alhagi maurorum. Drought-tolerant, it is found in the eastern Mediterranean and the Middle East.

References 

Hedysareae
Flora of Asia